Sweet Alibis is a 2014 Taiwanese comedy film starring Alec Su as a cowardly veteran cop and Ariel Lin as an overzealous rookie. The film follows the pair who team up to solve crimes together in Kaohsiung.

Plot
Starting from a seemingly pointless case of a puppy's accidental death, from eating chocolate, the essentially incompatible pair unexpectedly digs up the clues to a series of mysterious deaths.

Cast
 Alec Su 
 Ariel Lin
 Matt Wu
 Lei Hong
 Lang Tsu-yun
 Ken Lin
 Chu Chih-ying
 Austin Lin
 Kao Meng-chieh
 Ma Nien-hsien
 Bebe Du
 Tao Chuan-cheng
 Lin Chia-ling
 Lee Kuo-hung
 Ruby Lin - Cameo

Theme song
 "Lao Tian You Yan" (老天有眼) performed by Alec Su (originally sung by Hei-pao in the 1980s)

Reception
It was the number-one film in Taiwan box office for a week in January 2014, but overall grossing was disappointing with only NT$ 20.6 million (roughly $0.6 million) despite generally positive reviews. It was successful in the Chinese box office in March 2014, ranking only behind 2 Taiwanese films — You Are the Apple of My Eye (2011) and Black & White Episode I: The Dawn of Assault (2012) — in first-week grossing. It grossed ¥36.6 million (roughly $6 million) in mainland China.

Awards
2014 51st Golden Horse Film Festival and Awards
Nominated — Lang Tsu-yun, Best Supporting Actress
2014 Osaka Asian Film Festival
Nominated — Grand Prix
2014 6th Straits Film and Television Awards
Won — Favourite Taiwanese film in mainland China

Trivia
There are in-jokes in the film referencing characters from the TV series In Time with You (2011) starring Ariel Lin and Romance in the Rain (2001) starring Alec Su and Ruby Lin.

References

External links
 
 Youtube - Sweet Alibis Trailer with English subtitles
 Hollywood Reporter review
 Taipei Times review

2010s crime comedy films
2010s Mandarin-language films
Taiwanese crime comedy films
Films directed by Lien Yi-chi
2010s buddy cop films
2014 comedy films